The 2014 Circuit of Ireland was the fourth round of the 2014 European Rally Championship season, held in Ulster between 17–19 April 2014. The Circuit returned to the European Rally Championship over the Easter weekend, starting in Belfast, Northern Ireland.

Finnish driver Esapekka Lappi dominated the International section, towards the European Rally Championship, finishing almost two minutes ahead of second place Sepp Wiegand from Germany, who completed a Škoda 1–2. Irishman Robert Barrable finished third in his Ford Fiesta R5. Declan Boyle won the Circuit of Ireland National Rally in his Subaru Impreza S12B WRC, while teenage British driver Chris Ingram held the lead of the ERC Junior Championship event, but crashed out, handing the win to Czech driver Jan Černý. Ingram still became the youngest winner of the Colin McRae 'Flat Out' Award, handed to him by local hero Kris Meeke.

Entry list

Results

Junior ERC

References

2014 in Irish sport
2014 European Rally Championship season
Rally Ireland